Megachile ericetorum is a species of bee in the family Megachilidae. It was described by Amédée Louis Michel Lepeletier in 1841.

References

Ericetorum
Insects described in 1841
Taxa named by Amédée Louis Michel le Peletier